The 129th Maine Senate had 35 members each elected to two-year terms in November 2018. The first regular session was to be sworn in on December 5, 2018.

The 129th Senate party composition was:
 21 Democrats
 14 Republicans

Leadership

Senators

See also
 List of Maine State Senators

References

External links
 Maine Senate

Maine legislative sessions
2010s in Maine
2018 in Maine
2019 in Maine